Wing Commander Mark Henry Brown,  (9 October 1911 – 12 November 1941), nicknamed Hilly, was the first Canadian pilot to become a fighter ace during World War II whilst serving with the Royal Air Force during the Battle of France. He also flew in the Battle of Britain and was killed in action in November 1941 over Sicily.

Early life
Brown was a son of Mr. and Mrs. S. T. Brown, of Glenboro, Manitoba. Whilst working for the Bank of Montreal in Brandon (the building occupied by the Bank pre-war still stands on Rosser Avenue) he learned to fly at the Brandon Flying club and, after passing the required medical, left Canada to join the RAF in May 1936.

RAF career
After completing his flight training, Pilot Officer Brown joined No. 1 Squadron in February 1937. He was promoted to flying officer in December 1938.

World War II
At the beginning of September 1939, Brown's squadron was deployed to France as part of the RAF Advanced Air Striking Force. On 23 November 1939, Brown was credited with half a kill of a Dornier 17 whilst flying a Hawker Hurricane.

During the Battle of France in early 1940, Brown was involved in heavy fighting and on 20 April 1940 he claimed his first confirmed kill on a Messerschmitt Bf 109. He became the first Canadian pilot to reach ace status (five confirmed kills) on 14 May 1940 by claiming another Messerschmitt 109 destroyed. It is claimed that he was also the first Allied pilot to fly a captured German aircraft – a Messerschmitt Bf 109 – flying it to Britain where it was evaluated.

With the French surrender to the Germans, Brown came back to Britain and was shot down over Harwich on 15 August 1940 but managed to bail out suffering only minor injuries.
 
On 3 September 1940 Brown was promoted to flight lieutenant. In October 1941 he was posted to the Middle East.

Death
On 12 November 1941, along with Wing Commander Alexander Rabagliati, while operating from Malta, he led a strafing attack on the Italian airfield at Gela in Sicily. During the attack, Brown's Hurricane was hit by anti-aircraft fire and his plane crashed at the airfield. A little while later, during a raid on Malta, an Italian aircraft dropped a message that Brown had been buried with full military honours.

His record details 17 enemy aircraft destroyed and four shared kills.

Honours and awards
30 July 1940 – Acting Flight Lieutenant Mark Henry Brown (37904) is awarded the Distinguished Flying Cross

23 May 1941 – Acting Squadron Leader Mark Henry Brown DFC (37904), No. 1 Squadron, Royal Air Force, is awarded a Bar to the Distinguished Flying Cross

12 January 1943 – Czechoslovak Military Cross to Acting Squadron Leader Mark Henry Brown, DFC (37904), Royal Air Force

References

Royal Air Force pilots of World War II
1911 births
1941 deaths
Aviators killed by being shot down
People from Portage la Prairie
Canadian aviators
Canadian World War II pilots
Canadian World War II flying aces
Royal Air Force wing commanders
Recipients of the Distinguished Flying Cross (United Kingdom)
The Few
Recipients of the Czechoslovak War Cross
Royal Air Force personnel killed in World War II